Lock and Dam No. 6 is a lock and dam located near Trempealeau, Wisconsin on the Upper Mississippi River near river mile 714.1. It was constructed and placed in operation in June 1936. The last major rehabilitation was from 1989 to 1999. The lock and dam are owned and operated by the St. Paul District of the United States Army Corps of Engineers-Mississippi Valley Division.

See also
 Public Works Administration dams list
 Upper Mississippi River National Wildlife and Fish Refuge

References

External links
U.S. Army Corps of Engineers, St. Paul District: Lock and Dam 6
U.S. Army Corps of Engineers, St. Paul District: Lock and Dam 6 brochure

Mississippi River locks
Driftless Area
Buildings and structures in Trempealeau County, Wisconsin
Buildings and structures in Winona County, Minnesota
Transportation in Winona County, Minnesota
Dams in Minnesota
Dams in Wisconsin
United States Army Corps of Engineers dams
Transport infrastructure completed in 1936
Roller dams
Gravity dams
Dams on the Mississippi River
Mississippi Valley Division
1936 establishments in Minnesota
1936 establishments in Wisconsin
Historic American Engineering Record in Minnesota
Historic American Engineering Record in Wisconsin
Locks of Minnesota
Locks of Wisconsin